is a former Japanese pitcher regarded as one of the best Japanese strikeout pitchers of all-time. In , he recorded 401 strikeouts, which is still the world record.

Enatsu was a bit player in the Black Mist Scandal which embroiled Japanese baseball from 1969 to 1971. In November 1970 he received a stern warning from the Central League president due to "involvement with persons in baseball gambling."

His consecutive strikeouts were broken up by Katsuya Nomura. The two records are still unbroken.

A starting pitcher for the first part of his career, in 1977 he became a relief specialist, altogether accumulating 193 saves.

While playing with the Hiroshima Toyo Carp in 1979, Enatsu was the Central League MVP, as he compiled a 9–5 record with a 2.67 ERA and 117 strikeouts in 104-2/3 innings. That year the Carp won the Central League pennant and the Japan Series.

In 1981, with the Nippon-Ham Fighters, Enatsu was the Pacific League MVP, garnering 25 saves and a 2.82 ERA, as the Fighters won the Pacific League pennant.

Enatsu joined the Milwaukee Brewers for spring training in 1985 at age 36 in an attempt to play Major League Baseball. Enatsu finished spring training with a 4.91 ERA in 11 innings and was among the team's final cuts before the season.

In popular culture 
Enatsu is a major shadow-figure in Yōko Ogawa's novel The Housekeeper and the Professor (Hakase no ai shita sūshiki, 博士の愛した数式, 2003).

References

External links
 Career statistics and player information from Baseball-Reference

NPB History (Japanese)

1948 births
Living people
Sportspeople from Amagasaki
Baseball people from Nara Prefecture
Nippon Professional Baseball pitchers
Hanshin Tigers players
Hiroshima Toyo Carp players
Nankai Hawks players
Nippon Ham Fighters players
Seibu Lions players
Japanese expatriate baseball players in the United States
Nippon Professional Baseball MVP Award winners